Saurpani is Ward no.4 Sulikot Gaupalika (previously village development committee) in Gorkha District in the Gandaki Zone of northern-central Nepal. At the time of the 2011 Nepal census it had a population of 5,958 and had 1,325 houses in the town.

There is 24-hour electricity through mini-grids, the village can be reached by direct bus transportation from Kathmandu and form Gorkha. Saurpani is situated upon the hilltop about 1,439 m (4,721 ft) to 3200 m (10498 ft) above sea level.

Saurpani is approximately 59.8 km from Gorkha Palace and 68 km from Palungtar Airport. There is a gravel road from Abu Khaireney running on the bank of Daraudi River to Saurpani Bazar and another road is Ghyampeshal-Bakot-palkhu-swara-saurpani and Masel-Pandrun-Takukot-takumajh lakuribot-Saurpani.
The village was badly affected by an earthquake on 25 April 2015.

History
there is a story how saurpani got its name.

People believed Saurpani was ruled by Ghale King of Sulikot end of 12th century.

Economy
The maximum of the population are farmers. They mainly grow maize, millet and paddy. Most of the young and energetic population are either in capital or in different countries abroad. There is a village named sundardanda which is known for its delicious and mouth watering oranges.

Tourism
Before the road was made alongside river bank in daraudi river, porters, bores and traders used to take rations, provisions and the things for daily need from the hilly trail. There are no tourists except Trekkers.

References

Populated places in Gorkha District